Good Thang may refer to:

 "Good Thang" (song), a 1999 song by Robyn
 Good Thang (album), a 1978 album by Faze-O

See also 
 Good Thing (disambiguation)